Boman Irani (born 2 December 1959) is an Indian actor, photographer and voice artist who works predominantly in Hindi cinema he has also worked in Tamil, Telugu, Marathi, Kannada and Malayalam. He has acted in more than a hundred films in his career.

Early life 
Irani was born on 2 December 1959, in Bombay (now Mumbai) to an Irani Zoroastrian family. His father died 6 months before Irani was born (May 1959). Irani was dyslexic, as well as having ADHD and a lisp, which he eventually overcame.

His mother (b. 18 November 1926, d. 9 June 2021) often encouraged him to repeatedly watch movies at the Alexander Cinema—where he would go daily after school—to observe their cinematography and art. He finished his secondary schooling at St. Mary's School, after which he undertook a 2-year waiter course at Mithibai College in Mumbai.

Following his polytechnic diploma course, he joined the Taj Mahal Palace & Tower where he worked as a waiter and in room service for two years. With a promotion, he became a waiter at the hotel's rooftop French restaurant, Rendezvous

Until he was 32 years old, Irani also managed the bakery and namkeen shop that belonged to his mother—who took over from Irani's father after his passing—where he used to make and sell potato chips and tea. Located on Mumbai's Grant Road between Novelty Cinema and Apsara Cinema, this shop was also where Irani first met his mother-in-law.

Career

Photography career 
While working at the Taj Mahal Palace & Tower, using the tips that he received, Irani bought a camera and took sports pictures (school cricket and football matches), selling them for 20 to 30 rupees, which he continued till well after marriage. His epiphany came when he saved money for seven years to take his family for their first ever vacation to Ooty, but they ended up in a desolate run-down hotel called Shawham Palace. Irani decided to take control of his life, and instead of living the petty existence of a photographer selling small photos, he would start to dream and live big and provide more for his family. Irani calls it his "zero number bulb moment".

Irani continued to be a photographer, but now at the age of 32, went 6 months prior to the world boxing championships at Mumbai to meet Adajania, then-president of the Olympic Boxing Association of India, and requested to become the official photographer of the World Cup. When Adajania told him there was no need for him, Irani offered to work at his office for 6 months for free in return for a ring-side badge to cover the event. He continued to try to convince Adajania, and covered a state boxing match in a different manner than other photographers. Adajania was impressed by his photos and his passion and appointed Irani as the official photographer.

Meanwhile, he became the photographer for the Norwegian boxing team and photographed specific photos that they needed of Ole Klemetsen. When asked about his charges, Irani asked for the international rate. Irani took the required photos with his K-1000.

Theatrical career 
With acting having been a passion for Irani during his school and college days, he trained under acting coach Hansraj Siddhia from 1981 to 1983.

Irani's mentor was Alyque Padamsee—the veteran theatre actor best known for his role as Mohammad Ali Jinnah in Gandhi—whom he was introduced to by Shiamak Davar. Irani's earliest theatrical appearance was in Roshni, in which he played a cameo at the Regional Theatre in Versova. He followed this up with serials like Family Ties and Mahatma vs Gandhi, playing Gandhi after the role was turned down by Darshan Jariwala. His most illustrious play to date would be I Am Not Bajirao which ran for 10 years.

Film career 
Irani moved to on-screen acting in 2000. He started out in a number of advertisements such as Fanta, Ambuja Cements, Ceat and Krack Jack biscuits (as Mr. Jack of the Krack and Jack duo).

His small but significant role in Darna Mana Hai earned him acclaim. The film was declared a hit, and he was one of the most remembered segments of the film along with Saif Ali Khan. Irani gained attention for his role in the 2003 comedy Munna Bhai M.B.B.S.. His role as J. Asthana earned him a nomination for the Filmfare Award for Best Performance in a Comic Role. He later appeared in Lage Raho Munna Bhai for which he received several IIFA award nominations and in 3 Idiots opposite Aamir Khan which earned him the Filmfare Award for Best Supporting Actor and the Screen Award for Best Actor in a Negative Role.

Irani hosted the IIFA Awards, including in 2008 with actor Ritesh Deshmukh in Bangkok; 2009 in Macau; 2010 in Colombo; and 2011 in Toronto. He also hosted the quiz show Bollywood Ka Boss. He has been on Kaun Banega Crorepati with Sanjay Dutt, and has featured in OneTouch Glucose Meters TV commercials in 2015 with Simone Singh.

He launched his production house Irani Movietone in January 2019. Irani is about to make his directorial debut in 2022. In the same year, Irani appeared as Dr. Balraj Kapoor in the series Masoom.

Boman Irani has been a brand ambassador of P Mark Oil by Puri Oil (Mills), Exotica, Kent RO, Ahead NGO, and Saffola. Currently, he is also on the Board of Advisors of India's International Movement to Unite Nations (I.I.M.U.N.).

Spiral Bound

In 2020, Irani began a masterclass named Spiral Bound with the aim of uniting amateur and professional screenwriters. Screenwriter Alexander Dinelaris conducted the first workshop of Spiral Bound. The masterclass continued in on as online sessions during the COVID-19 pandemic. Guest speakers included playwright Anosh Irani and directors Raju Hirani, Ram Madhvani, and Shakun Batra
 Spiral Bound has completed more than 500 sessions.

Filmography

As actor

As dubbing artist
Teen Patti (2010) for Ben Kingsley

Awards

References

External links 

 

1959 births
Living people
20th-century Indian male actors
21st-century Indian male actors
20th-century Indian photographers
Irani people
Male actors in Telugu cinema
Indian male film actors
Indian male voice actors
Indian male stage actors
Male actors in Hindi cinema
Male actors from Mumbai
Mithibai College alumni
Filmfare Awards winners
Screen Awards winners
Zee Cine Awards winners
International Indian Film Academy Awards winners
People with dyslexia